Procyanidin B5 is a B type proanthocyanidin.

Procyanidin B5 is an epicatechin-(4β → 6)-epicatechin dimer.

Natural occurrences 
It can be found in grape seeds, in Hibiscus cannabinus (kenaf) root and bark, and in black chokeberries (Aronia melanocarpa).

 Presence in food
It is found in cocoa beans and chocolate.

References 

Procyanidin dimers
Chocolate